The Headmasters' and Headmistresses' Conference (HMC), formerly known as the Headmasters' Conference and now branded HMC (The Heads' Conference), is an association of the head teachers of 351 private fee-charging schools (both boarding schools and day schools), some traditionally described as public schools. 302 Members are based in the United Kingdom, Crown dependencies and the Republic of Ireland. There are 49 international  members (mostly from the Commonwealth) and also 28 associate or affiliate members who are head teachers of state schools or other influential individuals in the world of education, who endorse and support the work of HMC.

History 
The Conference dates from 1869 when Edward Thring, Headmaster of Uppingham School, asked sixty of his fellow headmasters to meet at his house to consider the formation of a "School Society and Annual Conference". Fourteen accepted the invitation, and twelve were present for the whole of the initial meeting: Edward Thring, George Blore (Bromsgrove School), Albert Wratislaw (Bury St Edmunds), John Mitchinson (The King's School, Canterbury), William Grignon (Felsted School), Robert Sanderson (Lancing College), George Butler (Liverpool College), Augustus Jessopp (Norwich School), William Wood (Oakham School), Steuart Pears (Repton School), T. H. Stokoe (Richmond), Daniel Harper (Sherborne School), and James Welldon (Tonbridge School). John Dyne (Highgate School) attended on the second day, and Alfred Carver (Dulwich College) did not turn up. From that date there have been annual meetings.

Until the 1970s, membership was confined to 200 schools.
In 1996, the association changed its name from the "Headmasters' Conference" to the "Headmasters' and Headmistresses' Conference".  In 2023, the name was changed to HMC (The Heads' Conference).

Membership of the HMC is often considered to be what defines a school as a public school in England and Wales. Not all independent schools are in the HMC; in particular, many notable girls' schools are not members, partly because historically the HMC was for boys' schools only. In 2005, the association opened membership to heads of girls-only schools. 
Today HMC's membership includes boys', girls' and co-educational schools.

List of HMC member schools 

The following are the member schools, listed with their Head (Headmaster or Headmistress). In some schools other titles are used, such as "Head Master", "High Master", "Warden", "Rector" and "Principal".
An up-to-date list of schools whose Heads are members of HMC can be found on the association's website.

England 
 The Abbey School, Reading — William Le Fleming
 Abingdon School – Mike J. Windsor
 Ackworth School — Anton Maree
 ACS International School Cobham, – Barnaby Sandow
 AKS Lytham — David Harrow
 Aldenham School — James Fowler
 Alleyn's School — Jane Lunnon
 Ardingly College — Ben Figgis
 Ashford School — Michael Hall
 Ashville College — Rhiannon Wilkinson
 Bablake and King Henry VIII School— Andrew Wright
 Badminton School – Rebecca Tear 
 Bancroft's School — Simon R.J. Marshall
 Barnard Castle School — Anthony C. Jackson
 Bedales School — Will Goldsmith
 Bede's School — Peter Goodyer
 Bedford School — James Hodgson
 Bedford Modern School — Alex N. J. Tate
 Benenden School — Samantha Price
 Berkhamsted School — Richard Backhouse
 Birkdale School — Peter Harris
 Birkenhead School — Paul Vicars
 Bishop's Stortford College — Kathy Crewe-Read
 Bloxham School — Paul Sanderson
 Blundell's School — Bart Wielenga
 Bolton School — Philip Britton 
 Bootham School — Christopher P. Jeffery 
 Box Hill School — Corydon Lowde
 Bradfield College — Christopher Stevens
 Bradford Grammar School — Simon Hinchliffe
 Brentwood School — Michael Bond
 Brighton College — Richard Cairns
 Bristol Grammar School — Jaideep Barot
 Bromley High School — Angela Drew
 Bromsgrove School — Peter Clague
 Bryanston School — Richard Jones
 The Bury Grammar Schools — Joanne Anderson
 Canford School — Ben Vessey
 Caterham School — Ceri Jones
 Charterhouse — Alex Peterken
 Cheadle Hulme School — Neil Smith
 Cheltenham College — Nicola Huggett
 The Cheltenham Ladies' College — Eve Jardine-Young
 Chetham's School of Music — Nicola Smith
 Chigwell School — Michael Punt
 Christ's Hospital — Simon H. C. Reid
 Churcher's College — Simon H. Williams
 City of London Freemen's School — Roland Martin
 City of London School — Alan Bird
 City of London School for Girls — Jenny A. Brown
 Claremont Fan Court School — William Brierly
 Clayesmore School — Joanne Thomson
 Clifton College — Tim Greene
 Cokethorpe School — Damian Ettinger
 Colfe's School — Richard Russell
 Colston's School — Jeremy McCullough
 Cranleigh School — Martin S. Reader
 Culford School — Julian Johnson-Munday
 Dame Allan's Schools — Will Scott
 Dauntsey's School — Mark J. Lascelles
 Dean Close School — Emma L. C. Taylor
 Denstone College — Lotte Tulloch
 Downe House School — Emma McKendrick
 Downside School – Andrew Hobbs
 Dulwich College — Joseph A.F. Spence
 Durham School — Kieran McLaughlin
 Eastbourne College — Tom Lawson
 Edgbaston High School — Clare Marco
 Ellesmere College — Brendan J. Wignall
 Eltham College — Guy R. Sanderson
 Emanuel School — Robert S. Milne
 Epsom College — Jay A. Piggot
 Eton College — Simon Henderson
 Exeter School — Louise Simpson 
 Felsted School — Christopher Townsend
 Forest School — Marcus Cliff Hodges
 Framlingham College — J. Louise M. North
 Francis Holland, Regent's Park — Charles Fillingham
 Francis Holland, Sloane Square — Lucy Elphinstone
 Frensham Heights School — Rick Clarke
 Giggleswick School — Sam Hart
 Godolphin School — Emma J.F. Hattersley
 The Godolphin and Latymer School — Frances M. Ramsey
 The Grammar School at Leeds A merger between the all-boys Leeds Grammar School (HMC member) and Leeds Girls' High School — Sue Woodroofe
 The Grange School — Lorraine Earps
 Gresham's School — Douglas Robb
 Guildford High School — Fiona J. Boulton
 Haberdashers' Boys' School — Gus R. Lock
 Haileybury — Martin Collier
 Halliford School — James Davies
 Hampton School — Kevin Knibbs
 Harrow School — W. M. Alastair Land
 Hereford Cathedral School — Michael Gray
 Highgate School — Adam S. Pettitt
 Hurstpierpoint College — Tim Manly
 Hymers College — Justin Stanley
 Ibstock Place School — Chris Wolsey
 Immanuel College — Gary Griffin
 Ipswich School  — Nicholas J. Weaver
 James Allen's Girls' School — Alex Hutchinson
 The John Lyon School — Katherine E. Haynes
 Kent College — Mark Turnbull
 Kent College, Pembury — Julie Lodrick
 Kimbolton School — Jonathan Belbin
 King Edward VI School, Southampton — Neal Parker
 King Edward's School, Bath — Martin J. Boden
 King Edward's School, Birmingham – Katy Ricks
 King Edward's School, Witley — Joanna Wright 
 King's Bruton — Ian S. Wilmhurst
 King's College, Taunton — Richard R. Biggs
 King's College School — Anne Cotton
 The King's School, Canterbury — Peter J.M. Roberts
 The King's School, Chester — George Hartley
 King's Ely — John Attwater
 The King's School, Gloucester — David C. A. Morton
 The King's School, Macclesfield — Jason Slack 
 King's Rochester — Ben Charles
 King William's College, Isle of Man – Joss Buchanan
 The King's School, Worcester — Gareth Doodes
 Kingston Grammar School — Stephen Lehec
 Kingswood School — Andrew Gordon-Brown
 Kirkham Grammar School — Daniel Berry
 Lady Eleanor Holles School — Heather Hanbury
 Lancing College — Dominic Oliver
 Langley School — Jon E. Perriss
 Latymer Upper School — David Goodhew
 Leicester Grammar School — John W. Watson
 Leighton Park School — Matthew L. S. Judd
 The Leys School — Martin J. Priestley
 Lincoln Minster School — Maria Young
 Lingfield College — Richard W. Bool
 Lord Wandsworth College — Adam Williams
 Loughborough Grammar School — Christopher Barnett
 Magdalen College School — Helen Pike
 Malvern College — Keith Metcalfe
 The Manchester Grammar School — Martin A. Boulton
 Marlborough College — Louise Moelwyn-Hughes
 Merchant Taylors' Boys' School, Crosby — David J. Wickes
 Merchant Taylors' School, Northwood — Simon Everson
 Millfield — Gavin Horgan
 The Mill Hill School Foundation — Antony Spencer
 Monkton Combe School — Chris Wheeler
 Moreton Hall — George Budd
 Mount Kelly — Guy Ayling
 Mount St Mary's College — Daniel Wright
 New Hall School — Katherine A. Jeffrey
 Newcastle High School for Girls — Michael Tippett
 Newcastle-under-Lyme School — Michael Getty
 Newcastle upon Tyne Royal Grammar School — Geoffrey Stanford
 Norwich School — Steffan Griffiths
 Norwich High School for Girls – Alison Sefton
 Nottingham High School — Kevin D. Fear
 Notting Hill & Ealing High School – Matthew R.C. Shoults
 Oakham School — Henry W.F. Price
 Oldham Hulme Grammar School — Craig J.D. Mairs
 The Oratory School — Joseph J. Smith
 Oswestry School — Lyndsay Lang
 Oundle School — Sarah Kerr-Dineen
 Pangbourne College — Thomas J.C. Garnier
 The Perse School — Edward C. Elliott
 Plymouth College — Jo Hayward
 Pocklington School — Toby Seth
 Portsmouth Grammar School — Anne K. Cotton
 Princethorpe College — Ed D. Hester
 Prior Park College — Ben J.C. Horan
 Putteridge High School – David Graham
 Putney High School — Suzie K. Longstaff
 Queen Anne's School — Julia Harrington
 Queen Elizabeth Grammar School, Wakefield — Richard Brookes
 Queen Elizabeth's Hospital — Rupert Heathcote
 Queen's College — Julian Noad
 Queenswood — Jo Cameron
 Radley College — John S. Moule
 Ratcliffe College — Jonathan P. Reddin
 Reading Blue Coat School — Peter Thomas
 Reed's School — Mark W. Hoskins
 Redmaids’ High School – Paul Dwyer
 Reigate Grammar School — Shaun A. Fenton
 Rendcomb College — Robert T. Jones
 Repton School — Mark Semmence
 Rossall School — Jeremy A. Quartermain
 Roedean School — Oliver Blond
 Royal Grammar School, Guildford — Jonathan M. Cox
 RGS Worcester — John D.C. Pitt
 Royal High School, Bath — Kate Reynolds
 The Royal Hospital School — Simon Lockyer
 The Royal Masonic School for Girls — Kevin Carson
 Royal Russell School — Christopher J. Hutchinson
 Rugby School — Peter R.A. Green
 Ryde School with Upper Chine — William Turner
 St Albans School — Jonathan W.J. Gillespie
 St Albans High School for Girls — Amber Waite
 St Bede's College — Sandra Pike
 St Benedict's School — Andrew Johnson
 St Columba's College, St Albans — David R. Buxton
 St Dunstan's College — Nicholas P. Hewlett
 St Edmund's College — Matthew Mostyn
 St Edmund's School — Edward G. O'Connor
 St Edward's School, Oxford — Alistair Chirnside
 St George's College, Weybridge — Rachel Owens
 St Helen and St Katharine — Rebecca J. Dougall
 St John's School, Leatherhead — Rowena Cole
 St Lawrence College — Barney Durrant
 St Mary's Calne — Felicia Kirk
 St Mary's College — Michael A. Kennedy
 St Mary's School Ascot — Danuta Staunton
 St Paul's Girls' School — Sarah K. Fletcher
 St Paul's School — Sally-Anne Huang
 St Peter's School — Jeremy M. P. Walker
 St Swithun's School — Jane S. Gandee
 Seaford College — John Green
 Sedbergh School — Dan Harrison
 Sevenoaks School — Jesse Elzinga
 Sherborne School — Dominic A. Luckett
 Sherborne Girls — Ruth M. S. Sullivan
 Shiplake College — Tyrone Howe
 Shrewsbury School — Leo Winkley
 Sidcot School — Iain Kilpatrick
 Sir William Perkins's School — Chris C. Muller
 Solihull School — Charles	Fillingham	
 South Hampstead High School — Victoria Bingham
 Stamford Endowed Schools — Will M. Phelan
 The Stephen Perse Foundation — Richard Girvan
 Stockport Grammar School — Paul M. Owen 
 Stonyhurst College — John R. Browne
 Stowe School — Anthony K. Wallersteiner
 Streatham and Clapham High School – Millan Sachania
 Surbiton High School — Rebecca Glover
 Sutton Valence School — James Thomas
 Taunton School — Lee C. Glaser
 Tonbridge School — James E. Priory
 Tormead School – David Boyd
 Tranby School — Alexandra Wilson
 Trent College — Bill J. Penty
 Trinity School — Alasdair J. Kennedy
 Truro School — Andrew Johnson
 University College School — Mark J. Beard
 Uppingham School — Richard J. Maloney
 Warminster School — Matt R. Williams 
 Warwick Schools Foundation – Richard Nicholson
 Wellingborough School — Andrew Holman
 Wellington College — James Dahl
 Wellington School — Eugene A. du Toit
 Wells Cathedral School — Alastair Tighe
 West Buckland School — Phillip Stapleton
 Westminster School — Gary Savage
 Whitgift School — Chris D. Ramsey
 Winchester College  — Tim Hands
 Wimbledon High School — Fionnuala Kennedy
 Wisbech Grammar School — Chris Staley
 Withington Girls' School — Sarah Haslam
 Woldingham School — James Whitehead
 Wolverhampton Grammar School — Alex Frazer
 Woodbridge School – Shona Norman
 Woodhouse Grove School — James Lockwood
 Worksop College – John Price
 Worth School — Stuart McPherson
 Wrekin College — Tim Firth
 Wycliffe College — Nick Gregory
 Wycombe Abbey — Jo F. Duncan
 Yarm School — P. Huw Williams

Scotland 
 Albyn School  – Stefan Horsman
 Dollar Academy — Ian H. Munro
 The Edinburgh Academy — Barry G. Welsh
 Erskine Stewart's Melville Schools — Linda A. Moule (consisting of two single-sex secondary schools – Stewart's Melville College and The Mary Erskine School - alongside the mixed gender ESMS Junior School and ESMS Sixth Form).
 Fettes College — Helen Harrison
 George Heriot's School — Gareth Warren
 George Watson's College — Melvyn W. Roffe
 The Glasgow Academy — Matthew K. Pearce
 Glenalmond College – Michael Alderson
 Gordonstoun School — Lisa Kerr
 High School of Dundee — Lise Hudson
 The High School of Glasgow — John O'Neill
 Hutchesons' Grammar School — Colin Gambles
 Kelvinside Academy — Daniel Wyatt
 Lomond School — Johanna Urquhart
 Loretto School — Graham Hawley
 Merchiston Castle School — Jonathan Anderson
 Morrison's Academy —Andrew McGarva
 Robert Gordon's College — Robin Macpherson
 St Aloysius' College — Matthew Bartlett
 St Columba's School, Kilmacolm — Victoria Reilly
 St Leonards School — Simon Brian
 Strathallan School — Mark Lauder

Wales 
 The Cathedral School, Llandaff — Clare Sherwood
 Christ College — Gareth D. Pearson
 Howell's School, Llandaff — Sally Davis
 Monmouth School for Boys – Simon Dorman
 Rougemont School —Robert Carnevale

Northern Ireland 
 Belfast Royal Academy — Hilary Woods
 Campbell College — Robert Robinson
 Coleraine Grammar School — David R.J. Carruthers
 Royal Belfast Academical Institution  — Janet Williamson
 Royal School, Armagh  — Graham G. W. Montgomery
 The Royal School Dungannon  — David Burnett

Guernsey 
 Elizabeth College — Jenny Palmer

Jersey 
 Victoria College — Dr Gareth hughes

Isle of Man 
 King William's College — Joss H. Buchanan

Republic of Ireland 
 Clongowes Wood College — Christopher Lumb
 The King's Hospital — Mark E. Ronan
 Saint Columba's College, Dublin — Mark T. Boobbyer

International members

Africa 
 Michaelhouse, Kwazulu-Natal, South Africa — Antony Clarke
 Peponi School, Ruiru, Kiambu County, Kenya — Mark Durston
 Peterhouse Boys' School, Marondera, Zimbabwe — Jonathan Trafford

Asia 
 The British School, New Delhi, India — Vanita Uppal
 British School Jakarta, Indonesia — David N. Butcher
 The Cathedral & John Connon School, Mumbai, India — Meera Isaacs
 The Doon School, Dehradun, India — Dr Jagpreet Singh
 Harrow International School Bangkok – Jonathan Standen
 Harrow International School, Hong Kong — Ann Haydon
 The International School Bangalore, India – Dr Caroline Pascoe
 Jerudong International School, Bandar Seri Begawan, Brunei Darussalam — Nicholas E. Sheehan
 Kellet School, The British International School in Hong Kong — Mark S. Steed
 Kolej Tuanku Ja'afar, Negeri Sembilan, Malaysia — Glenn Moodie
 Marlborough College, Malaysia — Alan D. Stevens
 Shrewsbury International School, Bangkok, Thailand — Chris P. Seal
 Tanglin Trust School, Singapore — Craig Considine

Australia and New Zealand 
 Anglican Church Grammar School, East Brisbane — Alan Campbell
 Camberwell Grammar School, Balwyn, Victoria — Paul Hicks
 The King's School, Parramatta, New South Wales — Anthony L. George
 Methodist Ladies' College, Kew, Melbourne — Diana C. Vernon
 Scotch College, Hawthorn, Victoria — I. Tom Batty
 The Scots College, Bellevue Hill, New South Wales — Ian P. M. Lambert
 St Leonard's College, Brighton East, Victoria — Stuart Davis
 Christ's College, Christchurch, Canterbury

Central, North and South America 
 The Grange School, Santiago, Chile — Rachid R. Benammar
 St George's College, Buenos Aires, Argentina — James Diver
 St George's College North, Los Polvorines, Buenos Aires, Argentina — Oliver Proctor
 St Paul's School, Brazil São Paulo, Brazil — Titus Edge

Continental Europe 
 Aiglon College, Chesières, Switzerland — Richard M. McDonald
 The British School of Barcelona, Spain — Jonathan Locke
 The British School of Brussels, Tervuren, Belgium — Melanie Warnes
 The British School of Milan, Italy — Chris Greenhalgh
 The British School of Paris, Croissy sur Seine, France — Nicholas Hammond
 The British School in the Netherlands, Voorschoten, The Netherlands — Heath Monk
 Campion School, Pallini, Athens, Greece— Mike Henderson
 The English College in Prague, Praha, Czech Republic — Nigel Brown
 The English School, Nicosia, Cyprus — David A. Lambon
 King's College, Soto de Viñuelas, Madrid, Spain — Matthew Taylor
 St Catherine's British School, Athens, Greece — Stuart Smith
 St George's, Rome – David P. Tongue
 St Julian's School, Quinta Nova, Portugal — Paul Morgan

Middle East 
 Brighton College Abu Dhabi, United Arab Emirates — Helen Wilkinson
 The British School – Al Khubairat, Abu Dhabi, United Arab Emirates — Mark Leppard
 British School Muscat, Ruwi, Sultanate of Oman — Kai Vacher
 Doha College, Doha, State of Qatar — Steffen Sommer
 Dubai College, Dubai, United Arab Emirates — Michael E. Lambert
 GEMS Wellington Academy, Dubai, United Arab Emirates – Kevin Loft
 Jumeirah English Speaking School, Dubai, United Arab Emirates — Shane O’Brien
 St Christopher's School, Isa Town, Kingdom of Bahrain — Simon Watson

Associates 
 Bangor Grammar School, Bangor, County Down – Elizabeth Huddleson 
 Bishop Wordsworth's School, Salisbury, Wiltshire — Stuart Smallwood
 Gordon's School, Woking, Surrey — Andrew Moss
 Methodist College Belfast, Belfast, County Antrim – Scott Naismith
 Monmouth School for Girls, Monmouth, Monmouthshire – Jessica Miles
 Pate's Grammar School, Cheltenham, Gloucestershire – Russel Ellicott
 The Judd School, Tonbridge, Kent – Jon Woods
 Wymondham College, Morley, Norfolk – Dan Browning

HMC Projects in Central and Eastern Europe 

HMC Projects in Central and Eastern Europe is a charity offering opportunities for students and young teachers from Central and Eastern Europe to develop themselves, by coming to HMC member schools in the UK for a year.

Chairs of the HMC

Chairmen of the Headmasters' Conference 
The following are the Chairmen of the HMC until 1996.

 Edward Thring, Headmaster, Uppingham School, 1869
 Daniel Harper, Head-master, Sherborne School, 1870
 John Dyne, Head Master, Highgate School, 1871
 A R Vardy, Chief Master, King Edward's School, Birmingham, 1872
 G Ridding, Head Master, Winchester College, 1873
 Alfred Carver, Master, Dulwich College, 1874
 John Percival, Headmaster, Clifton College, 1875
 T W Jex-Blake, Head Master, Rugby School, 1876
 G C Bell, Master, Marlborough College, 1877
 H M Butler, Head Master, Harrow School, 1878
 J J Hornby, Head Master, Eton College, 1879–80
 E C Wickham, Head Master, Wellington College, 1881
 H W Eve, Head Master, University College School, 1882–83
 E M Young, Head Master, Sherborne School, 1884–85
 W Haig Brown, Head Master, Charterhouse, 1886–87
 W A Fearon, Head Master, Winchester College, 1888–89
 E Warre, Head Master, Eton College, 1890–91
 L W Baker, Headmaster, Merchant Taylors' School, 1892–93
 E Warre, Head Master, Eton College, 1894–95
 H A James, Headmaster, Rugby School, 1896
 E Lyttelton, Headmaster, Haileybury, 1897
 H W Moss, Headmaster, Shrewsbury School, 1898–99
 Dr H B Gray, Head Master, Bradfield College, 1900
 H W Moss, Headmaster, Shrewsbury School, 1901
 C C Tancock, Headmaster, Tonbridge School, 1902
 E Lyttelton, Headmaster, Haileybury, 1903
 A W Upcott, Head Master, Christ's Hospital, 1904
 G Rendell, Head Master, Charterhouse, 1905
 S R James, Headmaster, Malvern College, 1906
 C E Brownrigg, Master, Magdalen College School, 1907
 R Arbuthnot Nairn, Head Master, Merchant Taylors' School, 1908
 W T A Barber, Headmaster, The Leys School, 1909
 E Lyttelton, Head Master, Eton College, 1910
 N C Smith, Head-master, Sherborne School, 1911
 J Gow, Head Master, Westminster School, 1912
 W C Eppstein, Headmaster, Reading Blue Coat School, 1913
 F Fletcher, Head Master, Charterhouse, 1914–15
 A A David, Headmaster, Rugby School, 1916–18
 F Fletcher, Head Master, Charterhouse, 1919
 A A David, Headmaster, Rugby School, 1920–21
 R Cary Gilson, Chief Master, King Edward's School, Birmingham, 1922
 F Fletcher, Head Master, Charterhouse, 1923
 Cyril Alington, Head Master, Eton College, 1924–25
 F Fletcher, Headmaster, Charterhouse, 1926–27
 R Cary Gilson, Chief Master, King Edward's School, Birmingham, 1928
 F. Fletcher, Headmaster, Charterhouse, 1929
 F B Malim, Master, Wellington College, 1930
 F Fletcher, Headmaster, Charterhouse, 1931
 F B Malim, Master, Wellington College, 1932
 D C Norwood, Head Master, Harrow School, 1933
 F Fletcher, Headmaster, Charterhouse, 1934
 F B Malim, Master, Wellington College, 1935
 H H Hardy, Headmaster, Shrewsbury School, 1936–38
 Spencer Leeson, Head Master, Winchester College, 1939–44
 J Wolfenden, Headmaster, Shrewsbury School, 1945
 J Wolfenden, Headmaster, Shrewsbury School, 1946
 H Lyon, Headmaster, Rugby School, 1947
 J Wolfenden, Headmaster, Shrewsbury School, 1948
 J Wolfenden, Headmaster, Shrewsbury School, 1949
 G C Turner, Headmaster, Charterhouse, 1950
 R Birley, Head Master, Eton College, 1951–52
 E James, High Master, The Manchester Grammar School, 1953–54
 Walter Hamilton, Headmaster, Westminster School, 1955–56
 R Birley, Head Master, Eton College, 1957–58
 Desmond Lee, Head Master, Winchester College, 1959–60
 C P C Smith, Headmaster, Haileybury, 1961–62
 D R Wigram, Headmaster, Monkton Combe School, 1963–64 and 1964–65
 Walter Hamilton, Headmaster, Rugby School, 1965–66
 Desmond Lee, Head Master, Winchester College, 1967
 D D Lindsay, Headmaster, Malvern College, 1968
 T E B Howarth, High Master, St Paul's School, 1969
 J MacKay, Headmaster, Bristol Grammar School, 1970
 A R D Wright, Headmaster, Shrewsbury School, 1971
 F H Shaw, Headmaster, King's College School, Wimbledon, 1972
 F F Fisher, Master, Wellington College, 1973
 Michael McCrum, Head Master, Eton College, 1974
 N P Barry, Headmaster, Ampleforth College, 1975
 R W Young, Principal, George Watson's College, 1976
 J M Rae, Headmaster, Westminster School, 1977
 David Baggley, Headmaster, Bolton School, 1978
 J S Woodhouse, Headmaster, Rugby School, 1979
 I D S Beer, Headmaster, Lancing College, 1980
 John Thorn, Head Master, Winchester College, 1981
 J W Hele, High Master, St Paul's School, 1982
 Roger Ellis, Master, Marlborough College, 1983
 David Emms, Master, Dulwich College, 1984
 B H McGowan, Headmaster, Haberdashers' Aske's Boys' School, 1985
 C H D Everett, Headmaster, Tonbridge School, 1986
 M J W Rogers, Headmaster, King Edward's School, Birmingham, 1987
 D A G Smith, Headmaster, Bradford Grammar School, 1988
 M M Marriott, Headmaster, Canford School, 1989
 D. J. Jewel], Master, Haileybury, 1990
 J. G. Parker, High Master, The Manchester Grammar School, 1991
 D. L. Milroy, Headmaster, Ampleforth College, 1992
 R. J. Wilson, Headmaster, Trinity School, 1993
 R. de C Chapman, Headmaster, Malvern College, 1994
 Hugh Wright, Chief Master, King Edward's School, Birmingham, 1995
 Anthony Evans, Headmaster, Portsmouth Grammar School, 1996

Chairs of the Headmasters' and Headmistresses' Conference 
The following are the Chairs of the HMC after 1996.
 Michael Mavor, Headmaster, Rugby School, 1997
 Patrick Tobin, Principal, Stewart's Melville College, 1998
 James Sabben-Clare, Headmaster, Winchester College, 1999
 Tom Wheare, Headmaster, Bryanston School, 2000
 Chris Brown, Headmaster, Norwich School, 2001
 E. Gould, Master, Marlborough College, 2002
 G. Able, Master, Dulwich College, 2003
 Martin Stephen, High Master, The Manchester Grammar School/St Paul's School, 2004
 Priscilla Chadwick, Principal, Berkhamsted Collegiate School, 2005
 Andrew Boggis, Warden, Forest School, 2006
 Nigel Richardson, Headmaster, The Perse School, 2007 <*>
 Bernard Trafford, Headmaster, Wolverhampton Grammar School, 2007–2008
 Tim Hastie-Smith, Headmaster, Dean Close School, 2008–2009
 Andrew Grant, Headmaster, St Albans School, 2009–2010
 David Levin, Headmaster, City of London School, 2010–2011
 Kenneth Durham, Headmaster, University College School, 2011–2012
 Chris Ray, High Master, Manchester Grammar School, 2012–2013
 Tim Hands, Master, Magdalen College School, 2013–2014
 Richard Harman, Headmaster, Uppingham School, 2014–2015
 Christopher King, Headmaster, Leicester Grammar School, 2015–2016
 Mike Buchanan, Headmaster, Ashford School, 2016–2017
 Christopher King, Headmaster, Leicester Grammar School, 2017-2018
 Shaun Fenton, Headmaster, Reigate Grammar School, 2018–2019
 Fiona Boulton, Headmistress, Guildford High School, 2019 -2020
 Sally-Anne Huang, High Master, St Paul's School, 2020-2021
 Richard Backhouse, Principal, Berkhamsted School, 2021-2022
 Melvyn Roffe, Principal, George Watson's College, 2022 - 2023

<*> Change to Academic Year Chairmanship

Chairs of the HMC Committee 
The following were Chairmen of the HMC Committee in the early years of the Conference.
In these years they served alongside the Chairman of the Conference (the ‘annual meeting’) until, in 1921, it was agreed that the Chairman of the Annual Meeting should always also be Chairman of the HMC Committee.
 G Ridding, Head Master, Winchester College, 1870, 1871, 1872
 Daniel Harper, Head Master, Sherborne School, 1874, 1875, 1876, 1877, 1878
 G C Bell, Master, Marlborough College, 1879, 1881, 1882, 1883, 1885, 1886, 1887
 T W Jex-Blake, Head Master, Rugby School, 1880
 E C Wickham, Head Master, Wellington College, 1884, 1888
 E Warre, Head Master, Eton College, 1889, 1893
 W A Fearon, Head Master, Winchester College, 1891, 1895
 E Lyttelton, Headmaster, Haileybury, 1898, 1902, 1904
 H W Moss, Headmaster, Shrewsbury School, 1900
 J Gow, Head Master, Westminster School, 1906, 1907, 1908, 1911
 R Cary Gilson, Chief Master, King Edward's School, Birmingham, 1909, 1910
 F Fletcher, Head Master, Charterhouse, 1913
 C Lowry, Headmaster, Tonbridge School, 1916

Chairs of the HMC by Institution

See also 
 Girls' Schools Association
 List of independent schools in the United Kingdom
 Headmasters' Conference of the Independent Schools of Australia

References

External links
 
 Catalogue of the HMC archives, held at the Modern Records Centre, University of Warwick

Private schools in the United Kingdom
Market Harborough
 
Organisations based in Leicestershire
Organizations established in 1869
Private school organisations in England
Teacher associations based in the United Kingdom
1869 establishments in the United Kingdom
1869 in education